Sir Robin John Taylor McLaren  (14 August 1934 – 20 July 2010) was a British diplomat.

Education
Robin McLaren was educated at Ardingly College, a boarding independent school for boys (now co-educational), in the village of Ardingly (near Haywards Heath) in West Sussex, followed by St John's College, Cambridge, and the School of Oriental and African Studies.

Life and career
McLaren was Chairman of Governors at Ardingly College, where the McLaren Library is named after him. He served in the Royal Navy from 1953 to 1955, and entered the Foreign Service in 1958. He held a range of diplomatic posts between 1958 and 1994, including being Assistant Private Secretary to Sir Edward Heath between 1963 and 1964. He went on to serve as British Ambassador to the Philippines between 1985 and 1987. He was senior British representative on the Sino-British Joint Liaison Group between 1987 and 1989, and British Ambassador to the People's Republic of China between 1991 and 1994. He was made  in 1991, having been made CMG in 1982.

Honours
  Knight Commander of the Order of St Michael and St George (KCMG) - 1991

References
Sir Robin McLaren, obituary, The Telegraph, 29 July 2010

External links
Interview with Sir Robin John Taylor McLaren & transcript, British Diplomatic Oral History Programme, Churchill College, Cambridge, 1996

1934 births
2010 deaths
People educated at Ardingly College
Alumni of St John's College, Cambridge
Alumni of SOAS University of London
Ambassadors of the United Kingdom to the Philippines
Ambassadors of the United Kingdom to China
Knights Commander of the Order of St Michael and St George
Knights Bachelor
Deaths from cancer in England